Kirti Puna (born 10 September 1955) is a New Zealand cricketer. He played in nine first-class and three List A matches for Northern Districts from 1971 to 1979.

See also
 List of Northern Districts representative cricketers

References

External links
 

1955 births
Living people
New Zealand cricketers
Northern Districts cricketers
Cricketers from Hamilton, New Zealand